This list provides information about the status of mammals alive today in Egypt. Three are critically endangered, three are endangered, eight are vulnerable, and one is near threatened.
The following tags are used to highlight each species' conservation status as assessed on the respective IUCN Red Lists:

Order: Tubulidentata (aardvarks) 

The order Tubulidentata consists of a single species, the aardvark. Tubulidentata are characterised by their teeth which lack a pulp cavity and form thin tubes which are continuously worn down and replaced.

Family: Orycteropodidae
Genus: Orycteropus
 Aardvark, O. afer

Order: Hyracoidea (hyraxes)

The hyraxes are any of four species of fairly small, thickset, herbivorous mammals in the order Hyracoidea. About the size of a domestic cat they are well furred, with rounded bodies and a stumpy tail. They are native to Africa and the Middle East.

Family: Procaviidae (hyraxes)
Genus: Heterohyrax
 Yellow-spotted rock hyrax, H. brucei 
Genus: Procavia
 Cape hyrax, P. capensis

Order: Sirenia (manatees and dugongs)

Sirenia is an order of fully aquatic, herbivorous mammals that inhabit rivers, estuaries, coastal marine waters, swamps, and marine wetlands. All four species are endangered. These animals live in warm coastal waters from East Africa to Australia, including the Red Sea, Indian Ocean, and Pacific.

Family: Dugongidae
Genus: Dugong
 Dugong, D. dugon

Order: Rodentia (rodents)

Rodents make up the largest order of mammals, with over 40% of mammalian species. They have two incisors in the upper and lower jaw which grow continually and must be kept short by gnawing.

Suborder: Hystricognathi
Family: Hystricidae (Old World porcupines)
Genus: Hystrix
 Crested porcupine, H. cristata  possibly extirpated
Suborder: Sciurognathi
Family: Gliridae (dormice)
Subfamily: Leithiinae
Genus: Eliomys
 Asian garden dormouse, E. melanurus 
Family: Dipodidae (jerboas)
Subfamily: Allactaginae
Genus: Allactaga
 Four-toed jerboa, Allactaga tetradactyla DD
Subfamily: Dipodinae
Genus: Jaculus
 Lesser Egyptian jerboa, Jaculus jaculus LC
 Greater Egyptian jerboa, Jaculus orientalis LC
Family: Spalacidae
Subfamily: Spalacinae
Genus: Nannospalax
 Middle East blind mole-rat, Nannospalax ehrenbergi LC
Family: Muridae (mice, rats, voles, gerbils, hamsters, etc.)
Subfamily: Deomyinae
Genus: Acomys
 Cairo spiny mouse, Acomys cahirinus LC
 Golden spiny mouse, Acomys russatus LC
Subfamily: Gerbillinae
Genus: Dipodillus
 North African gerbil, Dipodillus campestris LC
 Mackilligin's gerbil, Dipodillus mackilligini LC
Genus: Gerbillus
 Pleasant gerbil, Gerbillus amoenus DD
 Anderson's gerbil, Gerbillus andersoni LC
 Flower's gerbil, Gerbillus floweri LC
 Lesser Egyptian gerbil, Gerbillus gerbillus LC
 Pygmy gerbil, Gerbillus henleyi LC
 Balochistan gerbil, Gerbillus nanus LC
 Pale gerbil, Gerbillus perpallidus LC
 Greater Egyptian gerbil, Gerbillus pyramidum LC
 Lesser short-tailed gerbil, Gerbillus simoni LC
Genus: Meriones
 Sundevall's jird, Meriones crassus LC
 Libyan jird, Meriones libycus LC
 Shaw's jird, Meriones shawi LC
Genus: Pachyuromys
 Fat-tailed gerbil, Pachyuromys duprasi LC
Genus: Psammomys
 Sand rat, Psammomys obesus LC
Genus: Sekeetamys
 Bushy-tailed jird, Sekeetamys calurus LC
Subfamily: Murinae
Genus: Arvicanthis
 African grass rat, Arvicanthis niloticus LC
Genus: Nesokia
 Short-tailed bandicoot rat, Nesokia indica LC

Order: Lagomorpha (lagomorphs)
The lagomorphs comprise two families, Leporidae (hares and rabbits), and Ochotonidae (pikas). Though they can resemble rodents, and were classified as a superfamily in that order until the early 20th century, they have since been considered a separate order. They differ from rodents in a number of physical characteristics, such as having four incisors in the upper jaw rather than two.

Family: Leporidae (rabbits, hares)
Genus: Lepus
 Cape hare, L. capensis

Order: Erinaceomorpha (hedgehogs and gymnures)

The order Erinaceomorpha contains a single family, Erinaceidae, which comprise the hedgehogs and gymnures. The hedgehogs are easily recognised by their spines while gymnures look more like large rats.

Family: Erinaceidae (hedgehogs)
Subfamily: Erinaceinae
Genus: Hemiechinus
 Long-eared hedgehog, H. auritus 
Genus: Paraechinus
 Desert hedgehog, P. aethiopicus

Order: Soricomorpha (shrews, moles, and solenodons)
The "shrew-forms" are insectivorous mammals. Shrews and solenodons closely resemble mice, while moles are stout-bodied burrowers.
Family: Soricidae (shrews)
Subfamily: Crocidurinae
Genus: Crocidura
 Flower's shrew, C. floweri 
 African giant shrew, C. olivieri 
 Egyptian pygmy shrew, C. religiosa 
Lesser white-toothed shrew, C. suaveolens 
Genus: Suncus
 Asian house shrew, S. murinus

Order: Chiroptera (bats)
The bats' most distinguishing feature is that their forelimbs are developed as wings, making them the only mammals capable of flight. Bat species account for about 20% of all mammals.

Family: Pteropodidae (flying foxes, Old World fruit bats)
Subfamily: Pteropodinae
Genus: Rousettus
 Egyptian fruit bat, R. aegyptiacus 
Family: Vespertilionidae
Subfamily: Vespertilioninae
Genus: Eptesicus
 Botta's serotine, Eptesicus bottae LC
Genus: Hypsugo
 Desert pipistrelle, Hypsugo ariel DD
Genus: Nycticeinops
 Schlieffen's bat, Nycticeinops schlieffeni LC
Genus: Otonycteris
 Desert long-eared bat, Otonycteris hemprichii LC
Genus: Pipistrellus
 Egyptian pipistrelle, Pipistrellus deserti LC
 Kuhl's pipistrelle, Pipistrellus kuhlii LC
 Rüppell's pipistrelle, Pipistrellus rueppelli LC
Genus: Plecotus
 Christie's big-eared bat, Plecotus christiei DD
Family: Rhinopomatidae
Genus: Rhinopoma
 Egyptian mouse-tailed bat, R. cystops 
 Lesser mouse-tailed bat, Rhinopoma hardwickei LC
 Greater mouse-tailed bat, Rhinopoma microphyllum LC
Family: Molossidae
Genus: Tadarida
 Egyptian free-tailed bat, Tadarida aegyptiaca LC
 European free-tailed bat, Tadarida teniotisLC
Family: Emballonuridae
Genus: Taphozous
 Naked-rumped tomb bat, Taphozous nudiventris LC
 Egyptian tomb bat, Taphozous perforatus LC
Family: Nycteridae
Genus: Nycteris
 Egyptian slit-faced bat, Nycteris thebaica LC
Family: Rhinolophidae
Subfamily: Rhinolophinae
Genus: Rhinolophus
 Geoffroy's horseshoe bat, Rhinolophus clivosus LC
Lesser horseshoe bat, R. hipposideros 
Subfamily: Hipposiderinae
Genus: Asellia
 Trident leaf-nosed bat, Asellia tridens

Order: Cetacea (whales and dolphins and porpoises)

The order Cetacea includes whales, dolphins and porpoises. They are the mammals most fully adapted to aquatic life with a spindle-shaped nearly hairless body, protected by a thick layer of blubber, and forelimbs and tail modified to provide propulsion underwater.

Species listed below also includes species being recorded in Levantine Sea.

Suborder: Mysticeti
Family: Balaenopteridae
Genus: Balaenoptera
Fin whale, Balaenoptera physalus EN
 Bryde's whale, Balaenoptera edeni DD
 Common minke whale, Balaenoptera acutorostrata LC
Subfamily: Megapterinae
Genus: Megaptera
 Humpback whale, Megaptera novaeangliae LC and CR (Arabian Sea population)
Suborder: Odontoceti
Family: Physeteridae
Genus: Physeter
 Sperm whale, Physeter macrocephalus VU
Family: Ziphidae
Genus: Ziphius
 Cuvier's beaked whale, Ziphius cavirostris LC
Genus: Mesoplodon
 Gervais' beaked whale, Mesoplodon europaeus DD
Superfamily: Platanistoidea
Family: Delphinidae (marine dolphins)
Genus: Tursiops
 Common bottlenose dolphin, Tursiops truncatus LC
 Indo-Pacific bottlenose dolphin, Tursiops aduncus DD
Genus: Steno
 Rough-toothed dolphin, Steno bredanensis DD (once being considered as vagrants, but later confirmed as residential)
Genus: Stenella
 Striped dolphin, Stenella coeruleoalba DD
 Pantropical spotted dolphin, Stenella attenuata LC
 Spinner dolphin, Stenella longirostris LC
Genus: Sousa
 Indo-Pacific humpback dolphin, Sousa chinensis DD
Genus: Delphinus
 Short-beaked common dolphin, Delphinus delphis LC
 Indo-Pacific common dolphin, Delphinus tropicalis DD
Genus: Grampus
 Risso's dolphin, Grampus griseus LC
Genus: Orcinus
Orca, O. orca DD
Genus: Pseudorca
 False killer whale, Pseudorca crassidens DD
Genus: Globicephala
 Long-finned pilot whale, Globicephala melas DD
 Short-finned pilot whale, Globicephala macrorhynchus DD

Order: Carnivora (carnivorans)

There are over 260 species of carnivorans, the majority of which eat meat as their primary dietary item. They have a characteristic skull shape and dentition.
Suborder: Feliformia
Family: Felidae (cats)
Subfamily: Felinae
Genus: Acinonyx
Cheetah, A. jubatus  presence uncertain
Genus: Caracal
Caracal, C. caracal 
Genus: Felis
Jungle cat, F. chaus 
African wildcat, F. lybica 
Sand cat, F. margarita 
Subfamily: Pantherinae
Genus: Panthera
Leopard, P. pardus 
African leopard, P. p. pardus
Family: Viverridae (civets, mongooses, etc.)
Subfamily: Viverrinae
Genus: Genetta
Common genet, G. genetta 
Family: Herpestidae (mongooses)
Genus: Herpestes
Egyptian mongoose, H. ichneumon 
Genus: Ichneumia
White-tailed mongoose, I. albicauda 
Family: Hyaenidae (hyaenas)
Genus: Hyaena
Striped hyena, H. hyaena 
Genus: Proteles
Aardwolf, P. cristata 
Suborder: Caniformia
Family: Canidae (dogs, foxes)
Genus: Canis
Golden jackal, C. aureus  vagrant
African golden wolf, C. lupaster 
Gray wolf, C. lupus 
Arabian wolf, C. l. arabs
Genus: Vulpes
Blanford's fox, V. cana 
Rüppell's fox, V. rueppelli 
Red fox, V. vulpes 
Fennec fox, V. zerda 
Family: Mustelidae (mustelids)
Genus: Ictonyx
Saharan striped polecat, I. libyca 
Genus: Meles
Caucasian badger, M. canescens 
Genus: Mustela
Least weasel, M. nivalis 
Egyptian weasel, M. n. subpalmata 
Family: Phocidae (earless seals)
Genus: Monachus
 Mediterranean monk seal, M. monachus  possibly extirpated

Order: Perissodactyla (odd-toed ungulates)
The odd-toed ungulates are browsing and grazing mammals. They are usually large to very large, and have relatively simple stomachs and a large middle toe.
Family: Equidae (horses etc.)
Genus: Equus
 African wild ass, E. africanus  presence uncertain

Order: Artiodactyla (even-toed ungulates)

The even-toed ungulates are ungulates whose weight is borne about equally by the third and fourth toes, rather than mostly or entirely by the third as in perissodactyls. There are about 220 artiodactyl species, including many that are of great economic importance to humans.
Family: Bovidae (cattle, antelope, sheep, goats)
Genus: Gazella
 Arabian gazelle, G. arabica  presence uncertain 
 Dorcas gazelle, G. dorcas 
 Mountain gazelle, G. gazella  presence uncertain
 Rhim gazelle, G. leptoceros 
Subfamily: Caprinae
Genus: Ammotragus
 Barbary sheep, A. lervia 
Genus: Capra
Nubian ibex, C. nubiana

Locally extinct 
The following species are locally extinct in the country:
Addax, Addax nasomaculatus
Hartebeest, Alcelaphus buselaphus
Hippopotamus, Hippopotamus amphibius
African bush elephant, Loxodonta africana
African wild dog, Lycaon pictus
Arabian oryx, Oryx leucoryx
Scimitar oryx, Oryx dammah
Lion, Panthera leo
Hamadryas baboon, Papio hamadryas
Wild boar, Sus scrofa
Brown bear, Ursus arctos

See also
Wildlife of Egypt
Animal welfare in Egypt
List of chordate orders
Lists of mammals by region
Mammal classification

References

External links

Egypt
Egypt
Egypt
Mammals
Mammals
Mammals of North Africa